This is a list of Ukrainian football transfers in the summer transfer window 2008 by club. Only transfers of the Premier League, 1st League and 2nd League are included.

Premier League

FC Arsenal Kyiv 

In:

Out:

FC Chornomorets Odessa 

In:

Out:

FC Dnipro Dnipropetrovsk 

In:

Out:

FC Dynamo Kyiv 

In:

Out:

FC Illychivets Mariupol 

In:

Out:

FC Karpaty Lviv 

In:

Out:

FC Kharkiv 

In:

Out:

FC Kryvbas Kryvyi Rih 

In:

Out:

FC Lviv 

In:

Out:

FC Metalist Kharkiv 

In:

Out:

FC Metalurh Donetsk 

In:

Out:

FC Metalurh Zaporizhzhia 

In:

Out:

FC Shakhtar Donetsk 

In:

Out:

SC Tavriya Simferopol 

In:

Out:

FC Vorskla Poltava 

In:

Out:

FC Zorya Luhansk 

In:

Out:

First League

FC Desna Chernihiv 

In:

Out:

FC Dniester Ovidiopol 

In:

Out:

FC Dynamo-2 Kyiv 

In:

Out:

FC Enerhetyk Burshtyn 

In:

Out:

FC Feniks-Illychovets Kalinine 

In:

Out:

FC Helios Kharkiv 

In:

Out:

FC Ihroservice Simferopol 

In:

Out:

FC Knyazha Schaslyve 

In:

Out:

FC Komunalnyk Luhansk 

In:

Out:

FC Krymteplitsia Molodizhne 

In:

Out:

FC Naftovyk-Ukrnafta Okhtyrka 

In:

Out:

FC Obolon Kyiv 

In:

Out:

PFC Olexandria 

In:

Out:

FSC Prykarpattya Ivano-Frankivsk 

In:

Out:

PFC Sevastopol 

In:

Out:

FC Stal Alchevsk 

In:

Out:

FC Volyn Lutsk 

In:

Out:

FC Zakarpattia Uzhhorod 

In:

Out:

Ukrainian Second League

Druha A

FC Arsenal Bila Tserkva

FC Bastion Illichivsk

FC Bukovyna Chernivtsi

FC CSKA Kyiv

FC Desna-2 Chernihiv 

In:

Out:

FC Dnipro Cherkasy 

In:

Out:

FC Karpaty-2 Lviv

FC Knyazha-2 Schaslyve

FC Korosten

MFK Mykolaiv

FC Nafkom Brovary

FC Nyva Ternopil

PFC Nyva Vinnytsia

FC Obolon-2 Kyiv

FC Podillya-Khmelnytskyi

FC Ros' Bila Tserkva

FC Veres Rivne

FC Yednist' Plysky

Druha B

FC Arsenal Kharkiv 

In:

Out:

FC Dnipro-75 Dnipropetrovsk

FC Hirnik Kryvyi Rih

FC Hirnyk-Sport Komsomolsk

FC Illichivets-2 Mariupol

FC Kremin Kremenchuk 

In:

Out:

FC Metalurh-2 Zaporizhzhia

FC Olkom Melitopol

FC Olimpik Donetsk

FC Poltava

PFC Sevastopol-2

FC Shakhtar Sverdlovsk

FC Shakhtar-3 Donetsk 

In:

Out:

FC Stal Dniprodzerzhynsk 

In:

Out:

FC Titan Armyansk

FC Titan Donetsk

FC Sumy

FC Zirka Kirovohrad 

In:

Out:

See also 
Ukrainian Premier League 2008-09
Ukrainian First League 2008-09
Ukrainian Second League 2008-09
List of Ukrainian football transfers winter 2008–09

References

External links 
 Ukrainian Football Premier League- official site
 Professional football league of Ukraine – official site
 Football Federation of Ukraine – official site
Ukrainian Soccer Fan Club (ukrainiansoccer.net) – amateur's site
 UA:Football:News. Ukrainian Football

Transfers
Ukraine
2008